Marko Haanpää (born 23 September 1966) is a Finnish judoka. He competed in the men's half-middleweight event at the 1992 Summer Olympics.

References

1966 births
Living people
Finnish male judoka
Olympic judoka of Finland
Judoka at the 1992 Summer Olympics
Sportspeople from Tampere